The Heritage of Love (Geroy, "Hero") is a Russian romantic drama film inspired by a true story. It is set against the Russian Revolution and subsequent onset of civil war, as well as contemporary Paris. The film is directed by Yuriy Vasilev and written by Natalia Doroshkevich and Olga Pogodina-Kuzmina. The film stars Dima Bilan (in his first film role), Svetlana Ivanova, Aleksandr Adabashyan, Aleksandr Baluev, and Marat Basharov.

Plot
The film is set in 2016. Andrey Kulikov is a young machinist who is going to Paris to visit an old lady, and to buy the oldest Russian-made car, the Russo-Balt. While walking through Paris, Andrey sees a woman, Vera, and so starts the tale of two love stories, separated by three generations and one hundred years.

Later, when Andrey visits a cemetery he finds the grave of a young lady similar to the one he just met in Paris.

During his search to the past it becomes clear that Vera's and Andrey's fates are connected. His great-grandfather, Andrey Dolmatov, had been an officer in the White Army during the Russian Revolution and fell in love with Duchess Vera Chernisheva in the last days of the Russian Empire and in the Russian civil war.

Cast
Dima Bilan as Officer and Nobleman Andrey Dolmatov / Andrey Kulikov
Svetlana Ivanova as Duchess Vera Chernisheva / Vera Yezerskaya
Aleksandr Adabashyan as Lev Chij
Aleksandr Baluev as Tereshchenko
Marat Basharov as Baron Ivan Karlovich von Liven
Aleksandr Golovin as Repnin
Jurgita Jurkute as Irina Chernisheva 
Tatyana Lyutaeva as Duchess Chernisheva 
Viktor Nemets as Yefim
Lilita Ozolina	as Yelizaveta Yezerskaya von liven
Yulia Peresild as Masha Kulikova
Aleksandr Vasilev
Vladislav Vetrov as The Ducks 
Petar Zekavica as Mikhailenko
Mikolas Vildjunas as General Kornilov
Yuri Vasilev as The priest

Production

Music 
The musical score was composed by Eduard Artemyev, who has previously collaborated with Russian director Nikita Mikhalkov on numerous movies (At Home Among Strangers, An Unfinished Piece for a Player Piano, Burnt by the Sun, The Barber of Siberia, Sunstroke).

See also
 The Admiral

External links

Official website
The Heritage of Love at culturalsolidaritymedia.com

2016 films
2010s Russian-language films
2016 action drama films
2016 romantic drama films
2016 war drama films
Biographical films about military leaders
Russian historical drama films
Russian Civil War films
Russian action drama films
Russian romantic drama films
Russian war drama films
Russian World War I films
Films scored by Eduard Artemyev
Films set in Saint Petersburg
World War I films based on actual events
Films about Soviet repression
Russian Revolution films
Films set in 1916
Films set in 1918
Films set in 1921
Films set in 2016
War romance films
2010s historical romance films